Brian Keith Greer (born May 14, 1959) is a former Major League Baseball player.

Greer was drafted eighth overall in the 1977 draft. He was the youngest player on the Padres in 1977.

Sources

External links

1959 births
Living people
Amarillo Gold Sox players
Baseball players from California
Hawaii Islanders players
Major League Baseball outfielders
Navegantes del Magallanes players
American expatriate baseball players in Venezuela
People from Lynwood, California
Reno Padres players
Salem Redbirds players
San Diego Padres players
Walla Walla Padres players